Calilena is a genus of North American funnel weavers first described by R. V. Chamberlin & Wilton Ivie in 1941.

Species
 it contains twenty-one species:

Calilena absoluta (Gertsch, 1936) – USA
Calilena adna Chamberlin & Ivie, 1941 – USA
Calilena angelena Chamberlin & Ivie, 1941 – USA, Mexico
Calilena arizonica Chamberlin & Ivie, 1941 – USA
Calilena californica (Banks, 1896) – USA
Calilena gertschi Chamberlin & Ivie, 1941 – USA
Calilena gosoga Chamberlin & Ivie, 1941 – USA
Calilena magna Chamberlin & Ivie, 1941 – USA
Calilena nita Chamberlin & Ivie, 1941 – USA
Calilena peninsulana (Banks, 1898) – Mexico
Calilena restricta Chamberlin & Ivie, 1941 – USA
Calilena r. dixiana Chamberlin & Ivie, 1941 – USA
Calilena saylori Chamberlin & Ivie, 1941 – USA
Calilena siva Chamberlin & Ivie, 1941 – USA
Calilena stylophora Chamberlin & Ivie, 1941 – USA
Calilena s. laguna Chamberlin & Ivie, 1941 – USA
Calilena s. oregona Chamberlin & Ivie, 1941 – USA
Calilena s. pomona Chamberlin & Ivie, 1941 – USA
Calilena umatilla Chamberlin & Ivie, 1941 – USA
Calilena u. schizostyla Chamberlin & Ivie, 1941 – USA
Calilena yosemita Chamberlin & Ivie, 1941 – USA

References

External links

Agelenidae
Araneomorphae genera
Spiders of North America